Eaton Jackson Bowers (June 17, 1865 – October 26, 1939) was a U.S. Representative from Mississippi.

Born in Canton, Mississippi, Bowers attended the public schools, and Mississippi Military Institute at Pass Christian.
He studied law and gained admission to the bar in 1883 at the age of seventeen. He practiced in Canton until August 1884, when he moved to Bay St. Louis. There, he engaged in the practice of law and in newspaper work, serving as editor and proprietor of the Gulf Coast Progress at Bay St. Louis. He served as member of the Democratic State executive committee from 1886 to 1900, retiring from the newspaper business in 1890. He served as member of the Mississippi State Senate in 1896, and in the Mississippi House of Representatives in 1900. He served as delegate to the Democratic National Conventions in 1900 and 1916.

Bowers was elected as a Democrat to the Fifty-eighth and to the three succeeding Congresses (March 4, 1903 – March 3, 1911). He was not a candidate for renomination in 1910 to the Sixty-second Congress. He resumed the practice of law in Bay St. Louis, Hancock County, Mississippi, moving to New Orleans, Louisiana, and continuing the practice of law until his death there on October 26, 1939.

He was interred in Cedar Rest Cemetery, Bay St. Louis, Mississippi.

References

1865 births
1939 deaths
Democratic Party Mississippi state senators
Democratic Party members of the Mississippi House of Representatives
Democratic Party members of the United States House of Representatives from Mississippi
People from Bay St. Louis, Mississippi